The Municipality of Trent Hills is a township municipality in Northumberland County in Central Ontario, Canada. It is on the Trent River and was created in 2001 through the amalgamation of the municipalities of Campbellford/Seymour, Percy Township and Hastings. Thereafter it was known in brief as Campbellford/Seymour, Percy, Hastings.

Communities 

The municipality was historically four separate administrative subdivisions: the former town of Campbellford; the former village of Hastings; Seymour Township; and Percy Township. The latter two retain the status of geographic townships.

There are three population centres in Trent Hills: Campbellford; Hastings; and the former village of Warkworth, formerly the municipal seat of Percy Township prior to the amalgamation of Trent Hills. Smaller communities within the municipality include Allan Mills, Brickley, Burnbrae, Connellys, Crowe Bridge, Dartford, English Line, Godolphin, Green Acres, Healey Falls, Hoards Station, Kellers, Menie, Meyersburg, Norham, Percy Boom, Pethericks Corners, Stanwood, Sunnybrae, Trent River, West Corners, Westview and Woodland.

Demographics 

Mother tongue:
 English as first language: 94.8%
 French as first language: 1.1%
 English and French as first language: 0%
 Other as first language: 3.8%

Government 

The chart below shows the structure of the municipal government of Trent Hills. These politicians were elected as of the 2014 municipal election. Following the death of Hector Macmillan who had served as an elected official from 2003 until 2017, deputy mayor Bob Crate was elected mayor and Rosemary Kelleher-MacLennan deputy mayor by council.

The Member of Parliament for the riding of Northumberland—Peterborough South is Philip Lawrence of the Conservative Party of Canada. The Member of Provincial Parliament for Northumberland—Peterborough South (provincial electoral district) is David Piccini of the Progressive Conservative Party of Ontario.

See also 
List of townships in Ontario

References

External links 

Lower-tier municipalities in Ontario
Municipalities in Northumberland County, Ontario